The 2012 CERH European Championship or 2012 Roller Hockey European Championship was the 50th edition of the CERH European Roller Hockey Championship. It took place from 9 to 15 September, in Paredes, Portugal.

Venue
All games were played at the Pavilhão Municipal Rota dos Móveis, in Paredes.

Pool

All times are Western European Summer Time (UTC+1)

1st Day

2nd Day

3rd Day

4th Day

5th Day

6th Day

7th Day

References

External links
Comité Européen de Rink-Hockey CERH website

CERH European Roller Hockey Championship
Roller Hockey European Championship
Roller Hockey European Championship
European Championship